Attalea or Attaleia was a Roman city of ancient Lydia, former diocese and is presently a Latin Catholic titular bishopric.

Its modern location is Yanantepe in Asian Turkey.

History 
Attalea was originally named Agroeira or Alloeira. Attalea was important enough in the Roman province of Lydia to become a suffragan diocese of its capital Sardes's Metropolitan Archbishopric, and to mint coins. Yet it was to fade.

Titular see 
The diocese was nominally (re?)restored in 1933.

It is vacant, having had a single incumbent of the lowest (episcopal) rank :
 Carlo Maria Giuseppe de Fornari (1730.12.11 – ?), as emeritate; formerly Bishop of Aléria (1713.01.30 – 1715.02.20), Bishop of Albenga (Italy) (1715.02.20 – 1730.12.11)

See also 
 Catholic Church in Turkey

References

External links 
 GCatholic 

Catholic titular sees in Asia
Populated places in ancient Lydia
Former populated places in Turkey
Roman towns and cities in Turkey